Ungaran (Dutch: Oengaran) is a town in Central Java, Indonesia and the administrative centre of the Semarang Regency in the province of Central Java. Ungaran is located at -7° 8' 17", 110° 24' 18" at an elevation of 319 metres. It encompasses two districts (kecamatan) within the Regency - Ungaran Barat (West Ungaran) and Ungaran Timur (East Ungaran).

In the 19th century, defensive posts were established between Semarang and Surakarta to control the trade route between the two cities. A fort known as Fort Ontmoeting was established in Ungaran.

Climate
Ungaran has a tropical rainforest climate (Af) with moderate rainfall from June to September and heavy to very heavy rainfall from November to May.

References

Regency seats of Central Java